The Bit Player is a 2013 Filipino socio-realist drama-comedy film by Jeffrey Jeturian. The film stars Vilma Santos as Loida Malabanan, who spends her days dreaming of her big break while working with the country’s best small screen actors. The film competed under the Directors Showcase sidebar of 9th Cinemalaya Independent Film Festival. It topped the box office in all four venues of said festival. The film was released in mainstream theaters by Star Cinema on August 14, as part of their 20th Anniversary offering.

The film had its international premiere at the 2013 Toronto International Film Festival, set from September 5 to 15, under Contemporary World Cinema section. It also showed at the 2013 San Diego Asian Film Festival.

Plot 
The film follows a seemingly usual day in the life of Loida Malabanan (Vilma Santos) as she embarks on yet another shooting day of a soap opera as an extra. As the shoot goes on, we get a glimpse of the truth in the ruling system of the production as well as the exploitation of the marginalized laborers like her.

Cast 
Vilma Santos as Loida Malabanan
Fatima Centeno
Marlon Rivera
Vincent de Jesus
Ruby Ruiz
Tart Carlos
Hazel Faith Dela Cruz
Marian Rivera as Belinda
Piolo Pascual as Brando
Cherie Gil as Doña Beatrix
Pilar Pilapil
Tom Rodriguez
Eula Valdez
Cherry Pie Picache
Richard Yap
Terence Baylon

Awards 
9th Cinemalaya Independent Film Festival (Directors Showcase)
Special Jury Prize
Audience Choice
NETPAC Award
Best Actress – Vilma Santos
Best Supporting Actress – Ruby Ruiz
Best Screenplay
Nominated–Best Film
Gawad Tanglaw Awards 2014
Best Actress - (Vilma Santos)
13th Dhaka International Film Festival
Best Actress - (Vilma Santos)
2015 New York Festivals
Best Feature Film - Bronze

References

External links 

2013 films
2013 comedy-drama films
Philippine independent films
Star Cinema films
2013 independent films
Philippine comedy-drama films
Films directed by Jeffrey Jeturian